Hallucino-Genetics: Live 2004 is the first concert DVD from Primus, released in October 2004. The show was filmed on June 26, 2004 at the Aragon Ballroom in Chicago, Illinois, the band's last show of their 2004 tour. The performance features the original recording lineup of the band performing two sets, the second of which features the band playing their first studio album Frizzle Fry in its entirety.

Track listing

Personnel

Primus
Les Claypool – bass, upright bass, vocals
Larry LaLonde – guitar
Tim Alexander – drums

Production
Zoltron – producer
David Lefkowitz – management
Jesse Rice – project coordinator

Media
Zoltron – interface and packaging design
Adam Gates – interface design & live projections
Derek Featherstone – 2 track live mix (assisted by Scott Harvey), 5.1 surround mix (with Bob Edwards)
Dan Hayes – video editing
Brian Myers – video shoot producer, director
Kurt Branstetter – director of photography, camera operator
Carla Freestep – photographs
Rich Winter – encoding, authoring

Critical reception

In his review for Allmusic, Greg Prato notes that "despite a lengthy absence from the concert trail, Primus is as wild 'n' wacky as ever, and not afraid to veer off into an extended jam on a moment's notice." He contends that "the Frizzle Fry portion certainly doesn't disappoint", elaborating that "while sonically the set is top-notch, the camera work could have been better... few front shots of drummer Alexander are included, so there is no clear view of what he's playing most of the time", but concludes that "these complaints are small; Hallucino-Genetics Live 2004 is a faithful representation of the group's reunion tour."

References

Primus (band) video albums
2004 video albums
Prawn Song Records video albums